The International Communion of the Charismatic Episcopal Church (also known as the ICCEC) is an international Christian communion established as an Autocephalous Patriarchate in 1992 with over 1,000 churches worldwide. The Communion has its apostolic succession within the historical episcopate through the Rebiban line via Roman Catholic Bishop Carlos Duarte Costa, who founded the Brazilian Catholic Apostolic Church.

On 26 June 1992, Austin Randolph Adler was consecrated the first bishop and primate of the CEC with Timothy Michael Barker of the International Free Catholic Communion (who was consecrated by Archbishop-Patriarch Herman Adrian Spruit) functioning as the principal consecrator. In 1997, the Charismatic Episcopal Church sought and acquired reconsecration and reordination of all of its clergy by the Brazilian Catholic Apostolic Church, thus strengthening their lines of apostolic succession.

A = Brazilian Catholic Apostolic ChurchA1 = Luis Fernando Castillo MendezA2 = Josivaldo Pereira de OliveraA3 = Olinto Ferreira Pinto Filho
B = Episcopal Missionary ChurchB1 = William Millsaps
C = International Free Catholic CommunionC1 = Timothy Michael Barker
D = D1 = Delmer Tripp Robinson

List of bishops in the ICCEC

See also
Charismatic Episcopal Church timeline
Episcopal polity

References

Lists of Protestant bishops and archbishops
Bishops by denomination